The Somali Democratic Republic was the name that the socialist military government gave to Somalia under President Major General Mohamed Siad Barre, after seizing power in a coup d'état on 21 October 1969. The coup came a few days after a bodyguard assassinated Abdirashid Shermarke, the nation's second President. Barre's administration ruled Somalia for the next 21 years until Somalia collapsed into civil war in 1991.

History

Supreme Revolutionary Council

Alongside Barre, the Supreme Revolutionary Council (SRC) that assumed power after President Sharmarke's assassination was led by Lieutenant general Salaad Gabeyre Kediye and Chief of Police Jama Ali Korshel. Kediye officially held the title of "Father of the Revolution", and Barre shortly afterwards became the head of the SRC. The SRC subsequently arrested members of the former civilian government, banned political parties, dissolved the parliament and the Supreme Court, and suspended the constitution.

The revolutionary army established large-scale public works programs and successfully implemented an urban and rural literacy campaign, which helped dramatically increase the literacy rate. In addition to a nationalization program of industry and land, the new regime's foreign policy placed an emphasis on Somalia's traditional and religious links with the Arab world, eventually joining the Arab League (AL) in 1974. That same year, Barre also served as chairman of the Organization of African Unity (OAU), the predecessor of the African Union (AU).

In July 1976, Barre's SRC disbanded itself and established in its place the Somali Revolutionary Socialist Party (SRSP), a one-party government based on scientific socialism and Islamic tenets. The SRSP was an attempt to reconcile the official state ideology with the official state religion. Emphasis was placed on the Muslim principles of social progress, equality and justice, which the government argued formed the core of scientific socialism and its own accent on self-sufficiency, public participation and popular control, as well as direct ownership of the means of production. While the SRSP encouraged private investment on a limited scale, the administration's overall direction was proclaimed as socialist.

Ogaden campaign

In July 1977, the Ogaden War against Ethiopia broke out after Barre's government sought to incorporate the predominantly Somali-inhabited Ogaden region into a Pan-Somali Greater Somalia. The war was part of a broader SNA effort to unite all Somali territories (Soomaaliweyn). In the first week of the conflict, the Somali National Army scored spectacular victories over the Ethiopian forces, surprising many American military observers who took on a position of neutrality during the war. Southern and central Ogaden were captured in the early stages of conflict and for most of the war, the Somali Army scored continuous victories on the Ethiopian Army and followed them as far as Sidamo. By September 1977, Somalia controlled 90% of the Ogaden and captured strategic cities such as Jijiga and put heavy pressure on Dire Dawa, threatening the train route from the latter city to Djibouti. After the siege of Harar, a massive unprecedented Soviet intervention consisting of 20,000 Cuban forces and several thousand Soviet advisers came to the aid of Ethiopia's communist Derg regime. By 1978, a ceasefire was negotiated putting an end to the war. This shift in support by the Soviet Union motivated the Barre government to seek allies elsewhere. It eventually settled on the Soviet Union's Cold War arch-rival, the United States, which had been courting the Somali government for some time. All in all, Somalia's initial friendship with the Soviet Union and later partnership with the United States enabled it to build the largest army in Africa.

Collapse

After the unsuccessful Ogaden campaign, Barre's administration began arresting government and military officials under suspicion of participation in the abortive 1978 coup d'état. Most of the people who had allegedly helped plot the putsch were summarily executed. However, several officials managed to escape abroad and started to form the first of various dissident groups dedicated to ousting Barre's regime by force.

A new constitution was promulgated in 1979 under which elections for a People's Assembly were held. However, Barre's Somali Revolutionary Socialist Party politburo continued to rule. In October 1980, the SRSP was disbanded, and the Supreme Revolutionary Council was re-established in its place. By that time, Barre's government had become increasingly unpopular. Many Somalis had become disillusioned with life under military dictatorship. The regime was weakened further in the 1980s as the Cold War drew to a close and Somalia's strategic importance was diminished.

The government became increasingly totalitarian, culminating in the Isaaq genocide (1987-1988), largely destroying several major cities and targeting members of the Isaaq clan. Estimates of civilian deaths range from 50,000 to 100,000 up to over 200,000. Such tactics from the government prompted resistance movements, supported by Ethiopia, which sprang up across the country and eventually led to the Somali Civil War. Among the militia groups were the Somali Salvation Democratic Front (SSDF), United Somali Congress (USC), Somali National Movement (SNM) and the Somali Patriotic Movement (SPM), together with the non-violent political oppositions of the Somali Democratic Movement (SDM), the Somali Democratic Alliance (SDA) and the Somali Manifesto Group (SMG). 

Barre was removed from power on January 26, 1991, and Somalia subsequently collapsed into anarchy.

President
Mohamed Siad Barre (October 21, 1969 – January 26, 1991)

Prime ministers
Mohamed Farah Salad (November 1, 1969 – March 1970)
Post abolished (March 1970 – February 1, 1987)
Muhammad Ali Samatar (February 1, 1987 – September 3, 1990)
Muhammad Hawadle Madar (September 3, 1990 – January 24, 1991)

References

Further reading

Former socialist republics
States and territories disestablished in 1991
States and territories established in 1969
1970s in Somalia
1980s in Somalia
Communism in Somalia
Communist states
Somali Civil War
1969 establishments in Somalia
1991 disestablishments in Somalia
Totalitarian states
1991 disestablishments in Africa
Socialist states